Paul Rankin is a British Democratic Unionist Party (DUP) politician. He was co-opted as a Member of the Legislative Assembly (MLA) for Lagan Valley on 14 March 2022 after Edwin Poots switched to South Belfast following the sudden death of Christopher Stalford in February 2022. Prior to becoming an MLA, Rankin was a councillor on Armagh City, Banbridge and Craigavon Borough Council.

Rankin was only an MLA for two weeks after being co-opted, as the Assembly was dissolved at the end of March ahead of the May Assembly election, for which he was not selected as a DUP candidate in Lagan Valley.

References

Year of birth missing (living people)
Living people
Democratic Unionist Party MLAs
Northern Ireland MLAs 2017–2022
Mayors of places in Northern Ireland